Wojciechowo Wielkie is a village in the administrative district of Gmina Syców, within Oleśnica County, Lower Silesian Voivodeship, in south-western Poland. Prior to 1945 it was part of Germany.

The village has a population of 220.

References

Wojciechowo Wielkie